Concurso Nacional de Belleza 1985 was held on May 5, 1984. There were 24 candidates who competed for the national crown. The winner of the title Miss Dominican Republic, represented the Dominican Republic at the Miss Universe 1985. The Señorita República Dominicana Mundo entered Miss World 1985. The Señorita República Dominicana Café entered Reinado Internacional del Café 1985.

Results

Delegates

Azua - Yocasta Reyes Fernández
Azua - Marina Medina
Barahona - Laura Soto
Distrito Nacional - Marielly Rodríguez
Distrito Nacional - Maritza del Villar
Distrito Nacional - Thania Castillo
Distrito Nacional - Sigrid Angiolina Sánchez Pichardo
Distrito Nacional - Melba Altagracia Vicéns Bello
Distrito Nacional - Zelba Delgado
Distrito Nacional - Tammy Berroa
Espaillat - Sofia Ureña
La Romana - Mayra Perón
La Vega - Olivia Oviedo
La Vega - Sarah Tavares
María Trinidad Sánchez - María Mercedes Batista
Monte Cristi - Miledy López
Puerto Plata - Belkis Hidalgo
Salcedo - Rita Elvira Marques
Santiago - Mariela González Hernández
Santiago - Josefina González 
Santiago Rodríguez - Mary Elisa Collado
Valverde - Cesarina de Moya

External links
 https://web.archive.org/web/20090211102742/http://ogm.elcaribe.com.do/ogm/consulta.aspx

Miss Dominican Republic
1985 beauty pageants
1985 in the Dominican Republic